The Daihatsu H-series engine is a range of four-stroke four-cylinder, internal combustion piston engines, designed by Daihatsu, which is a subsidiary of Toyota. These engines were produced from 1987 through 2009. Ranging from 1.3 L up to 1.6 L, these four-cylinder engines were built with lightness in mind, featuring a hollow crankshaft and camshaft, and the weight of a four-cylinder engine (1.3 L HC) is similar to the 1.0 L three-cylinder CB engines. The H-series engine has aluminium engine blocks and cylinder heads, timing belt driven heads, water-cooled engine cooling system, equipped with both carburetors (earlier models) and Multi-Point Fuel Injection (later models) and only available in 16-valve SOHC design.

HC (1.3 L) 
Based from Japanese Wikipedia article
First appeared in Daihatsu Charade G102/112 in 1987 and discontinued in 2009. The displacement is 1.3 L (1295 cc), bore and stroke is 76.0 mm x 71.4 mm. Available with carburettor (HC-C/F) and fuel injection (HC-E/EJ). The compression ratio is between 9.0:1 to 9.5:1. This engine was later replaced by the K3 engine.

Applications:
Daihatsu Charade (G102/112/200) (1988–2000)
Daihatsu Terios/Toyota Cami (J100G) (1997–1999) (Japan)
Daihatsu Zebra/D130 Jumbo/Hijet Maxx (S89/91) (1989–2009) (Indonesia/Malaysia)
Perodua Kembara (1998–2003) (Malaysia)
Perodua Rusa (1996–2005) (Malaysia)
Shelby Patriot (a front-mid engine SUV-style vehicle based from Daihatsu Zebra S89 with body made from fibreglass, only sold in Indonesia) (1990–1994)

HD (1.6 L) 
Based from Japanese Wikipedia article
First appeared in Daihatsu Applause in June 1989 and discontinued in 2008. The displacement was increased to 1.6 L (1589 cc) by increasing the stroke size of the HC engine to 87.6 mm but retaining the same 76.0 mm bore size. Available with carburettor (HD-C/F1) or fuel injection (HD-E/E1/EG/EP). The compression ratio is between 9.5:1 to 10.5:1.

Applications:
Daihatsu Applause (1989–2000)
Daihatsu Charade De Tomaso/GTi (G201) (1993–1998)
Daihatsu Feroza (F70/75) (Indonesia)
Daihatsu Pyzar/Gran Move (1996–2002)
Daihatsu Rocky (F300) (1989–2002)
Daihatsu Taruna (F500RV/F520RV) (1999–2001) (Indonesia)
Daihatsu Zebra Espass (S92) (1994–2003) (Indonesia)
Perodua Rusa (1997–2008) (Malaysia)
Daihatsu X-021 concept car (1991)

HE (1.5 L) 
The HE engine first appeared in the Daihatsu Charade (G203/213) in 1993 and was discontinued in 2007. The displacement was decreased to 1.5 L (1498 cc) by decreasing the stroke size of HD engine to 82.6 mm but retained the same 76.0 mm bore size. The compression ratio is 9.5:1. This engine was later replaced by the Toyota 3SZ-VE engine.

Applications:
Daihatsu Charade (G203/213) (1993–2000)
Daihatsu Taruna (F501RV/F521RV) (2001–2006) (Indonesia)
Daihatsu Pyzar/Gran Move (1996–2002)
Daihatsu Zebra Espass (S92) (2003–2007) (Indonesia)

See also
List of Daihatsu engines

References 

H